Daniel "Danny" West is a fictional character appearing in American comic books published by DC Comics. The character was created by writers-artists Francis Manapul and Brian Buccellato, and first appeared in The Flash #0 (cover dated November 2012). He is also the most recent character to take up the mantle of the Reverse-Flash.

Introduced in the post–Flashpoint universe of The New 52, Daniel is introduced as the younger brother of Iris West. Shortly after an encounter with the Rogues, Daniel is involved in an accident with the Speed Force, and is granted powers. Wishing to repair his strained relationship with Iris, Daniel decides to kill people affected by the Speed Force to take their speed and travel back in time, in order to kill his abusive father. However, his plans were foiled by the Flash / Barry Allen, and he lost his abilities.

Regaining his powers, he was forced into the Suicide Squad. Danny was killed when, while throwing a bomb out into the ocean, it detonated.

Despite his death, Daniel continues to play a role in DC Rebirth, where it is revealed that despite being originally presented as Wallace West's uncle, he was actually his biological father.

Publication history
Daniel's first appearance occurred as a teenager in The Flash #0 in November 2012. The story was set five years before the present and he was only identified on-panel as Danny.

Francis Manapul and Brian Buccellato first revealed that Reverse-Flash would appear in The Flash in November 2012. According to them, the inclusion of Reverse-Flash in the series wasn't due to them wanting to include the character, but because they felt it was the "natural place to go". Manapul stated that originally, they planned on not using the character until much later in the series but decided to include him due to where the story and characters were heading.

Fictional character biography

Early life
Daniel West is the younger brother of Iris West. His mother died while giving birth to him. Their mother's death drove their father William to become an alcoholic and abusive towards his children, blaming Daniel for her death. One day, when he was 12 years old, after William ridiculed and hit him, Daniel pushed his father down the stairs, crippling him. Upon realizing that Iris had witnessed the event, and seeing how horrified she was by his actions, Daniel ran away from home and never came back.

Five years later, by the time he was 18, Daniel had become a small-time thug and joined a stickup crew. His first big job involved his crew stealing money from a bank, with him acting as the lookout and driver. Before the robbery, Daniel had sought Iris out in an attempt to reconnect, telling her he was planning to use the money to secure both of them financially. Iris rejected his offer and told him to make amends with their father. While the robbery was successful, their escape plan was foiled by the Flash (Barry Allen), and Daniel got five years in prison. On the same day, his attempt at escaping from prison was also prevented by Barry, who was visiting his father.

Encounter with the Rogues
Daniel got early parole and was released from prison around the same time Gorilla Grodd started his invasion on Central City. During the invasion, Daniel attempted to contact Iris and ensure her safety. He visited her apartment, only to find out it was empty and that she had been missing for three months. While running away from the gorillas and attempting to save some civilians, Daniel was captured. After his capture, Daniel was placed inside a bus to be sent to the Central City football stadium, as one of the many humans used by the gorillas to create a telepathic illusion of the Gem Cities as having been destroyed. On the way to the football stadium, Daniel was saved by the Rogues, who took the busses full of captured civilians to the Mirror Master's Mirror World. Daniel attempted to escape the Rogues but he was crashed into Dr. Elias' car which was powered by a speed force battery. The accident cause Daniel to run back in time but the power was dependent on the Speed Force charge in the battery.

Reverse-Flash
Daniel dubs himself the Reverse-Flash and begins killing those with Speed Force abilities to drain their speed so that he could run fast enough so he could run back in time to kill his father. Eventually, the only two remaining with Speed Force energy are Barry and Iris. Barry is unable to sense Daniel through the Speed Force due to his containment suit. Daniel lures The Flash into Dr. Elias' lab where he used his power to go back in time. Daniel's plan to kill his father is backfired when he sees his younger self and Iris come home. Daniel attempts to kill his father while the Flash defends the young Daniel and Iris. The Flash convinces Daniel to not kill his father and so he gives up his Speed Force to the Flash in order to fix his mistake. The two return to the present and is sent back to Iron Heights.

New Suicide Squad and Death
Daniel is recruited into the Suicide Squad while also discovering he has his speed back although isn't as fast as The Flash. The Squad have discovered a time bomb in a Turkish village in which they refuse to remove. Daniel decides to run back to the village to do so. He throws the time bomb into an ocean where it detonates, while running back to the group, Daniel trips over on the water and is sucked into a vortex created by the explosion. Daniel's skin on his hand begins to come off and leaves a skeletal hand and dies a hero.

References

Fictional criminals
Comics characters introduced in 2012
DC Comics characters who can move at superhuman speeds
DC Comics supervillains
Flash (comics) characters
Fictional characters who can manipulate time
Fictional characters with absorption or parasitic abilities
Fictional characters with superhuman senses
Time travelers
Suicide Squad members